Continental Barum (formerly just Barum) is a manufacturer of rubber tyres based in the Czech Republic under the Barum brand.

History
The Barum tyre company was created as a subsidiary of Bata Shoes who made rubber soled boots in Czechoslovakia. The high cost of rail transport prompted the Bata company to operate its own fleet of vehicles to transport goods by road and in 1934, to counteract the high costs involved in importing tyres for its fleet of vehicles, the company decided to produce tyres for its own use.  In 1945 the three major rubber-producing companies in Czechoslovakia were merged — Bata in Zlín, Rubena in Náchod (Kudrnáč pre-1945) and Mitas (Michelin + Veritas) in Prague-Strašnice and post-war in Hrádek nad Nisou, being originally a subsidiary of Michelin. The Bata family lost control of the company, which was seized by the state and the Barum company was created.

In 1966 the construction of a brand new manufacturing facility commenced in Otrokovice and the following year the first radial tyre was produced at the factory in Zlin. The factory was named Rudý říjen (Red October) in 1953, after the October 1917 revolution in Russia.

In 1972 Tyre manufacture ceased in Zlin when a new plant was built in Otrokovice.

In 1983, Barum sponsored rally competitions for the first time. At that time, no one imagined that these races would become an important event in the world motorsport calendar. Today, Barum Czech Rally Zlin is one of the stages of the European Rally Championship. Also, for many years, Barum has supported racing on historic rally cars Star Rally Historic.

In 1992 a joint venture agreement was signed with Continental AG.

References

External links

Continental AG website
Barum history at oponeo.co.uk

Czech brands
Tire manufacturers of the Czech Republic
Manufacturing companies of Czechoslovakia
Continental AG